3 Faces is a 2018 Iranian drama film directed by Jafar Panahi and starring Behnaz Jafari and Panahi as themselves. The film was produced despite a ban on filmmaking imposed on Panahi. It was selected to compete for the Palme d'Or at the 2018 Cannes Film Festival, winning the award for Best Screenplay.

Plot 
Behnaz Jafari, a popular Iranian actress, searches for a young girl (Marziyeh) in northwestern Iran with her friend Jafar Panahi, a director, after seeing a video of the girl asking for help to leave her conservative family.

The film takes the form of a road movie, much of it taking place in and around Panahi's SUV. Several whimsical encounters take place on the trip, with local characters and traditions. Marziyeh is eventually discovered living, ostracised from the village, with two other aspiring actresses in a tiny house.

Cast 
 Behnaz Jafari as herself
 Jafar Panahi as himself
 Marziyeh Rezaei as 'Marziyeh'
 Maedeh Erteghaei
 Narges Del Aram

Production 
3 Faces was Jafar Panahi's fourth film made under his 20-year filmmaking ban imposed by the government of Iran, after This Is Not a Film, Closed Curtain, and Taxi. It is filmed in a remote Turkish (Azerbaijani) speaking part of Iran where Panahi's parents hail from.

Of necessity the filming is often 'rough and ready', including an opening sequence filmed using a hand held mobile phone.

Critical reception 
3 Faces has a 78/100 average on Metacritic. Variety describes the film as an "absorbing paradox", where Panahi shifts the emphasis onto "a whole underclass of Iranian womanhood" in "what feels like his freest film" and "most elusive" since his film-making ban. The review says the film is a "quietly fierce act of cinematic defiance."

The Los Angeles Times described the film as a "multi-generational portrait" with "its quotidian poetry, its deep reserves of mystery and its rich rewards for an open-hearted audience".

Awards and recognition 
The film was selected to compete for the Palme d'Or at the 2018 Cannes Film Festival.
At Cannes, Panahi and co-writer Nader Saeivar won the award for Best Screenplay.

The film also won the Golden Orange at the Antalya Golden Orange Film Festival, the Douglas Sirk Award at the Hamburg Film Festival, and the Leon Cakoff Prize at the São Paulo International Film Festival

References

External links 

2018 films
2018 drama films
2010s drama road movies
Films about actors
Films directed by Jafar Panahi
Films shot in Iran
Iranian drama films
Mobile phone films
2010s Persian-language films
Azerbaijani-language films in Iran
2018 multilingual films
Iranian multilingual films